Smith-Ripley House, also known as Ripley House Museum, is a historic home located at Adams in Jefferson County, New York. It was built in 1854 and is a two-story Italianate style house with an 1883 two-story addition in the southeast corner and a 1967 one story addition in the rear.  Sitting on a stone foundation, the main block is three bays wide and three bays deep.  The exterior is red brick construction with the exception of the wood 1967 addition.  Also on the property is a carriage house dating to 1854.

It was listed on the National Register of Historic Places in 2008.

References

External links
 Ripley House Museum - Historical Association of South Jefferson

Houses on the National Register of Historic Places in New York (state)
Historic house museums in New York (state)
Georgian architecture in New York (state)
Houses completed in 1854
Historical society museums in New York (state)
Museums in Jefferson County, New York
Houses in Jefferson County, New York
National Register of Historic Places in Jefferson County, New York